Córdoba F.C. was a Colombian football (soccer) team, based in Montería, Córdoba, Colombia. The club was founded in 2006 and played in Categoría Primera B. Due to financial difficulties, the club was relocated and the end of the 2008 season to the city of Sincelejo and rebranded as Atlético La Sabana.

External links
 http://www.dimayor.com.co/Equipos/Cordoba_317-9623.html

Football clubs in Colombia
Association football clubs established in 2006
Association football clubs disestablished in 2008
Defunct football clubs in Colombia
2006 establishments in Colombia
2008 disestablishments in Colombia
Categoría Primera B clubs